Battery Garesche or Battery Garesché was a Union Army artillery battery built as part of the defenses of Washington, D.C. in the American Civil War at what is now Abingdon Street at South 30th Road in Fairlington, Arlington County, Virginia.

The battery was named after Lieutenant Colonel Julius P. Garesché who was killed on 31 December 1862 at the Battle of Stones River in Tennessee.

History
It was constructed in late 1861 to control the high ground over Fort Reynolds,  to the southeast, and to protect it from Confederate attack from positions on Seminary Ridge. 

Although located in Virginia, a Confederate state, this was part of the area near Washington that was never controlled by Confederate forces.
The battery no longer exists and is now noted only with a historical marker.

Another Battery Garesché commemorated the deceased lieutenant colonel much later at Fort Williams, in Cape Elizabeth, Maine. 
It was a concrete shore battery which contained two disappearing 6-inch (155 mm) guns. 
Built in 1906, its armed existence was brief, as its guns were removed for use on the Western Front in World War I.

References

External links

Garesche, Battery
Garesche
Virginia in the American Civil War
Buildings and structures in Arlington County, Virginia
1861 establishments in Virginia
Military units and formations established in 1861
1865 disestablishments in Virginia